The Composers' Union of Armenia is a non-governmental organization that unites and officially represents professional composers and musicologists in Armenia. The Union was established in 1932. Currently, the Chairman of the Union is Aram Satian, who succeeded Robert Amirkhanyan in 2013.

External links 
 Official website

Musical groups established in 1932
Trade unions in Armenia
Armenian composers
Music organizations based in Armenia
20th-century composers
21st-century composers